National Route 483 is a national highway of Japan connecting between Toyooka, Hyōgo and Tamba, Hyōgo in Japan, with a total length of .

References

483
Roads in Hyōgo Prefecture

ja:北近畿豊岡自動車道#国道483号